Thomasia rhynchocarpa is a species of flowering plant in the family Malvaceae and is endemic to the Southwest Australia south-west of Western Australia. It is an erect, slender shrub with narrowly egg-shaped leaves with a heart-shaped base, and pink to purple flowers.

Description
The edges of the leaves are sometimes lobed, the edges wavy and both surfaces have scattered hairs. The sepals are pink to purple, sometimes white, and joined for about half their length. There are minute bracts at the base of the flowers and the petals are tiny. Flowering mainly occurs from July to December, and the fruit is a dehiscent capsule.

Taxonomy and naming
Thomasia brachystachys was first formally described in 1852 by Nikolai Turczaninow in Bulletin de la Société Impériale des Naturalistes de Moscou. The specific epithet (brachystachys) means "a short flower spike".

Distribution and habitat
This thomasia grows in heath and shrubland or in forest near watercourses and swamps in near-coastal areas from Yallingup to Pemberton, and further east to the Stirling Range and Porongurup National Parks.

Conservation status
Thomasia brachystachys is classified as "not threatened" by the Western Australian Government Department of Biodiversity, Conservation and Attractions.

Use in horticulture
This thomasia is described as a dramatic species that has proved reliable in a range of conditions when grown in well-drained soil, but appreciates water during dry periods. It can be propagated from both seed and cuttings.

References

rhynchocarpa
Rosids of Western Australia
Plants described in 1852
Taxa named by Nikolai Turczaninow